Brewer infarcts are a histological finding found in renal disease. They can indicate pyelonephritis.

They are named after George Emerson Brewer.

References

Nephrology